The Dr & Mrs Hung Hin Shiu Museum of Chinese Medicine is a privately run museum managed by the Department of Chinese Medicine at the Hong Kong Baptist University.

History
The museum was inaugurated on 14 December 2007. Funded through part of the HK$120 million endowment fund from Dr Hung Hin-shiu and his wife Yeung Pong-wah, who made their fortune through the real estate development firm of Shiu Pong Enterprises.

In the museum a herbalist shop in the basement displays the tools and herbal, animal and mineral medicines that Traditional Chinese Medicine practitioners used, while other exhibits explore the importance of the “spleen” in Chinese medicine and the evolution of midwifery in Hong Kong. In 2021 the museum website stated that it is closed to the public until further notice.

Database
 Chinese Medicine Specimen Database 中藥標本數據庫  School of Chinese Medicine, Hong Kong Baptist University.(in English and Chinese)

See also
 Hong Kong Baptist University
 List of museums in Hong Kong

References

Museums in Hong Kong
Traditional Chinese medicine